Gals is a series of Russian communication satellites. The first launch was on 20 January 1994, for Chinese TV broadcast.

References

External links 
 GALS-1 details and orbit tracking map
 GALS-2 details and orbit tracking map

Satellite television
Communications satellites in geostationary orbit